Bosschaert is a surname. Notable people with the surname include:
 
Ambrosius Bosschaert (1573–1621), Dutch still life painter
Jan Bosschaert, Belgian comics artist
Jan  Baptist Bosschaert, Flemish still life painter
Johannes Bosschaert, Dutch still life painter
Renaat Bosschaert, Belgian artist
Thomas Willeboirts Bosschaert, Belgian Baroque painter